
Gmina Bełchatów is a rural gmina (administrative district) in Bełchatów County, Łódź Voivodeship, in central Poland. Its seat is the town of Bełchatów, although the town is not part of the territory of the gmina.

Villages
Gmina Bełchatów contains the villages and settlements of Adamów, Augustynów, Bukowa, Dobiecin, Dobiecin-Kolonia, Dobrzelów, Domiechowice, Helenów, Huta, Janina, Janów, Józefów, Kałduny, Kielchinów, Korczew, Księży Młyn, Kurnos Drugi, Kurnos Pierwszy, Ławy, Łękawa, Ludwików, Mazury, Mokracz, Myszaki, Niedyszyna, Oleśnik, Podwody, Podwody-Kolonia, Poręby, Postękalice, Rząsawa, Wielopole, Wola Kruszyńska, Wola Mikorska, Wólka Łękawska, Zawadów, Zawady, Zdzieszulice Dolne, Zdzieszulice Górne and Zwierzchów.

Neighbouring gminas
Gmina Bełchatów is bordered by the town of Bełchatów and by the gminas of Drużbice, Grabica, Kamieńsk, Kleszczów, Kluki, Wola Krzysztoporska and Zelów.

References

Polish official population figures 2006

Belchatow
Bełchatów County
Bełchatów